Carl Andersson (10 February 1884 – 2 February 1977) was a Swedish wrestler. He competed in the men's freestyle middleweight at the 1908 Summer Olympics.

References

External links
 

1884 births
1977 deaths
Swedish male sport wrestlers
Olympic wrestlers of Sweden
Wrestlers at the 1908 Summer Olympics
People from Skurup Municipality
Sportspeople from Skåne County